The Bogatyr class were a group of protected cruisers built for the Imperial Russian Navy. Unusually for the Russian navy, two ships of the class were built for the Baltic Fleet and two ships for the Black Sea Fleet.

Description 

Although Askold was the fastest cruiser in the Russian fleet at the time of its commissioning, Bogatyr was selected for further development into a new class of ships.

The Bogatyr-class cruisers normally displaced . The engines were powered by 16 coal-fired Belleville boilers. The standard crew consisted of 573 officers and men.

The ships were rearmed during World War I with fourteen 55-caliber  B7 Pattern 1913 guns in single mounts, four of which were mounted in casemates. The anti-aircraft armament consisted of two  guns.

Ships 

  was built by Vulkan yard, Stettin, Germany. Laid down 1898, launched January 1901, completed 1902, scrapped 1922. Her machinery was used to repair Komintern.
  was built by New Admiralty Yard, St Petersburg. Laid down 1901, launched August 1903, completed 1904, fought at the Battle of Tsushima, escaped, and was interned at Manila.  Finally sunk by British Coastal Motor Boat 4 with a single torpedo in Kronstadt harbour on 17 June 1919 during the Baltic Naval War. The wreck was salvaged and scrapped.
  (renamed Ochakov, later General Kornilov) was built by Sevastopol dockyard. Laid down 1900, launched October 1902, completed 1905, seized by the White forces in the Russian Civil War and interned in Bizerta in 1920 as part of Wrangel's fleet, sold for scrap in 1933.
  (later Komintern) was built by Nikolayev Dockyard. Laid down 1900, launched June 1903, completed 1907. Mutinied during the revolution of 1905 which delayed completion. Survived the Russian Civil War and served in the Soviet Navy, Black Sea Fleet as Komintern. Damaged by German bombers in World War II she was sunk as a breakwater in Poti, Georgia on 10 October 1942, after her guns had been removed for use in shore batteries.
 A fifth ship, Vityaz, being built in St. Petersburg was so badly damaged by a fire after laying down that she was cancelled.

References

Sources

External links

 Cruiser Komintern from Black Sea fleet 
 Bogatyr class

 
 
Wrangel's fleet